Anuj Sawhney is an Indian actor in Bollywood.

Filmography

References

External links

Living people
Indian male film actors
Indian male voice actors
Male actors from Mumbai
Year of birth missing (living people)